Metropolitan John (secular name Johannes Wilho Rinne; 16 August 1923 – 1 July 2010) was the Orthodox Archbishop of Karelia and All Finland from 1987 to 2001.

Birth
Rinne was born in Turku, Finland, on 16 August 1923 to a family belonging to the Evangelical Lutheran Church of Finland.

Priesthood and episcopacy
Rinne joined the Eastern Orthodox Church in 1966, and he received a doctorate in theology from Finland's Åbo Akademi University in 1966. In 1967 he received monastic tonsure in the Monastery of Saint John the Theologian in the island of Patmos (Greece). Following his ordination to the diaconate and priesthood at the Ecumenical Patriarchate, in 1969 he was elected and consecrated Bishop of Lapland, Auxiliary to the Archbishop of Karelia and All Finland, of the autonomous Finnish Orthodox Church.

In 1971 Rinne received a doctorate in canon law from the University of Thessaloniki. He was appointed as the Metropolitan of Helsinki in 1972, a position he held until 1987. He was elected Archbishop of Karelia and All Finland and head of the autonomous Finnish Orthodox Church in 1987. He went into retirement in 2001, receiving from the Ecumenical Patriarchate the title of Metropolitan of Nicaea.

Death
Rinne died on 1 July 2010.

References

1923 births
2010 deaths
Eastern Orthodox Archbishops of Finland
People from Turku
Eastern Orthodox Christians from Finland
Converts to Eastern Orthodoxy from Lutheranism
Recipients of the Order of the Cross of Terra Mariana, 2nd Class
Bishops of Nicaea
Swedish-speaking Finns
Åbo Akademi University alumni